CEEMAC is a programming language developed in the 1980s for the Apple II family of computers.  It was authored by Brooke Boering and published by Vagabondo Enterprises,

CEEMAC was designed to be a visual composition language in which the programmer designed dynamic "scores" by programatically controlling color, shape, sound and movement. Additionally, a programmer could then "perform" their score through use of the Apple II keyboard or paddle input devices to introduce additional variation.

CEEMAC syntax loosely resembled a combination of BASIC and Pascal and include control commands such as GOTO, GOSUB, DO, AGAIN, FOR, SKIP, EXIT and loop control structures such as IF/WHILE and TIL/UNLESS. Additionally, 30 predefined macros were included in CEEMAC to aid in score composition.

The following is a small CEEMAC sample score:
		    SCORE: KT
      			:FIRE ORGAN  KEY T
      			SPEED [0,0]
      			: - BUT 0
      			0
      			CLEAR [0,0]
      			XY1 = $80;$80
     			: MAIN LOOP
      			F
     			:FORGND SYMMETRY 0-3
      			VC = RND3 ORA 3
      			: SAVE FORGND ROTATION
      			VD = ROTEZ
      			:FORGND COLOR
      			COLOR = NXTCOL

CEEMAC was originally marketed through distribution of a free demonstration program entitled Fire Organ.  This program contained several scores created by Boering and other programmers to demonstrate some of the capabilities of the language.

Sources

External links
A structured graphics language: Ceemac
CEEMAC and Fire Organ Information, screen shots, liner notes
Ceemac: A Language for Teachers, Artists, and Animators
Fire Organ demonstration in an online Apple II emulator
Video of Fire Organ CEEMAC demonstration program

Programming languages created in the 1980s